Half-court is a term used in basketball for the middle of the court. A half court shot taken from the half-court, referred to as a half-court shot, is a shot taken from beyond the 3-pointer line as defined by a semicircular line before the 2-pointer zone. Anything beyond the half-court line and on the side of the court a team or player is defending is considered a full-court shot. It is most commonly used as a buzzer beater as here is a limited amount of time before a turnover. It is also used as a streetball term where the teams only use half of the full court. The most common backcourt shot style is known as "the Runner". If the shooter has a few seconds to spare, "the Runner" can be used to shorten the distance to the rim while also adding extra power to the shot. Other backcourt shot styles include: "the Sheed" (named after Rasheed Wallace); "the Contested Prayer"; and "the Zoran".

Half-court shots are widely considered to be the lowest percentage shot in basketball. Collectively, NBA players try shots from beyond half-court a few hundred times each season; approximately 1 in 100 of those shots are made. A half-court shot is attempted roughly 25 percent of the time to finish the first, second, or third quarter; though, and much rarer in the fourth. In some instances, NBA players will intentionally avoid shooting a half-court shot before the buzzer. Such players are more interested in protecting their field goal percentage than providing an opportunity (though unlikely) for the team to acquire 3 more points. Since field goal percentage is accounted for during contract negotiations, some players think it is an intelligent business decision to refuse to toss a low percentage shot at the rim. 
As a result, some believe that half-court shots should not be included in the field goal percentage.

Andre Miller may have attempted over his career the most half-court shots of any player. During his first 13 seasons in the NBA, Miller went 3-for-102 from beyond half court. Jason Williams and Andre Miller each attempted 12 half-court shots in 2001. Take the half-court misses away and Miller's three-point percentage goes from roughly 26 to 32%.

The record for most half-court shots made in a single NBA season - by all NBA players combined - was set in the 2014 season at 13. He shot it with 0.7 seconds remaining in the third quarter as a defender closely guarded him. Baron Davis is the only player to have hit a shot from at least  in a game; since the year 2000, it has been attempted at least a total of 40 times. During his career, Baron Davis went 2-for-43 from beyond half court.

2010 and 2012 are the only NBA seasons when two half-court shots were made on the same night.

During Jason Kidd's career, he made 4 of 44 (roughly 10%) from beyond half-court.

Notable half-court shots
 At the 2012 Olympic games, Australia's Belinda Snell sank a half-court launch with less than one second on the clock against France to send the game into overtime.
 Vince Carter entered The Guinness Book of World Records for hitting an  shot while sitting down.
 The current record holder for most half-court shots in a minute is Green Bay point guard Eric Valentin, with eight shots scored in 60 seconds. Though, a kid named Adam Beatrice has released a video of him making ten half-court shots in a minute. 
 On January 22, 2010, during a winter sports pep rally, students of Olathe Northwest High School wanted to play a prank on coach Joel Branstrom, a former University of Kansas walk-on, and promised him tickets of the Final Four game if he scores a shot from half-court while blindfolded - the catch was that the crowd was instructed to cheer regardless whether he scored the shot or not. Branstrom did, however, score the shot. The students didn't have any tickets to offer. It was widely reported in the media; while filming a teaser for WDAF-TV, reporter Rob Low jokingly attempted to recreate the shot by standing in the same court with his back to the hoop and throwing the ball - he also scored the shot, much to his surprise. According to Low, when he later interviewed Branstrom, and asked him to repeat the blindfolded feat, he, again, scored it. Branstrom attended the 2010 NCAA men's Final Four as a guest of the NCAA.
 In 2014, during an out-of-game competition, Fresno State's Guard Cezar Guerrero made five consecutive half-court shots.
During a half-court shooting contest in the West All-Star Game Practice, Stephen Curry hit three half-court shots in a row.
Harlem Globetrotter Buckets Blakes has the Guinness World record for most underhanded half-court shots made in one minute, dropping 6.
Gonzaga's Kyle Wiltjer set the record for the farthest behind-the-back shot, which he made at half-court.
NBA legend and basketball hall of fame member Moses Malone notably made a half-court shot during the last game of his career when his San Antonio Spurs faced the Charlotte Hornets in 1995.
During the 1999 WNBA Championship, which was played in a best of three games format, the New York Liberty trailed the Houston Comets one game to zero heading to Houston for game 2 and, if necessary, game 3. Houston ultimately won the series, but the play, which has become known as "The Shot", was named the best moment in WNBA playoff history by ESPN.
Jerry West hit a 60 ft shot at the end of regulation for the Lakers in Game 3 of the 1970 NBA Finals, tying the game and sending it to overtime (though the Knicks would eventually win that game, and the series).
During a game against the Pacers on 15. November 2015, with 1.1s to go Jae Crowder of the Celtics heaved a last-ditch full-court pass that turned into a bank shot. However, since he was out-of-bounds during the errant pass, the 94 foot shot did not count and instead was ruled a turnover.

NBA half-court statistics

References

Basketball terminology